Enchanted Treasures is a 1981 fantasy role-playing game supplement published by Reilly Associates.

Contents
Enchanted Treasures is a description of 36 magic items usable in any fantasy role-playing game.

Reception
Lewis Pulsipher reviewed Enchanted Treasures in The Space Gamer No. 47. Pulsipher commented that "7,000 words for [that price]? No FRP supplemental material is that good. Enchanted Treasures would have been an excellent 4-5 page magazine article (with proper editing), but 4-5 pages is a small fraction of a [...] magazine. It's terribly overpriced."

References

Fantasy role-playing game supplements
Role-playing game supplements introduced in 1981